The church of San Cosimato is a church located in the city of Rome, Italy.  It was originally built in the 10th century in the Trastevere rione and now includes the hospital known as "Nuovo Regina Margherita."  Originally, it was built as a Benedictine monastery dedicated to Saints Cosmas and Damian, from whom it derives its name, and it carried the added designation of in mica aurea (“in the golden sand”) due to the presence of fluvial sand of yellowish color.  

The monastery was transferred from the jurisdiction of the Benedictine Order to that of the nuns known as the Recluses of Saint Damian (Recluse di san Damiano).  From 1233, the church served as a hostel.   

Pope Sixtus IV had the church and monastery rebuilt in 1475, and after 1870, the convent was converted into a hospital.  The façade of the church looks upon a public square that is also called San Cosimato.  The church has a small Romanesque bell tower. 

The presbytery contains a fresco called Madonna and Child between Saints Francis and Claire, by Antonio del Massaro.

Roman Catholic churches in Rome
10th-century churches in Italy
Churches of Rome (rione Trastevere)